CAPPE or variation, may refer to:

 Centre for Applied Philosophy, Politics and Ethics at the University of Brighton
 Centre for Applied Philosophy and Public Ethics at Charles Sturt University (now defunct)
 Cappe, surname

See also

 
 
 
 Capp (disambiguation)
 Cape (disambiguation)
 Cap (disambiguation)
 CAP (disambiguation)